Unboxed is a compilation album of early singles and the EP Call Now by the band Free Kitten, released in 1994.

Track listing
 "Skinny Butt"
 "Platinumb"
 "Smack"
 "Falling Backward"
 "Oneness"
 "Dick"
 "Yoshimi vs. Mascis"
 "Oh Bondage Up Yours!" (Poly Styrene)
 "1,2,3"
 "Party with Me Punker" (Mike Watt)
 "John Stark's Blues"
 "Guilty Pleasures"
 "Sex Boy" (Darby Crash)
 "Cleopatra"
 "Loose Lips"
 "Oh Baby"

Personnel
 Kim Gordon - Vocals, Guitar
 Julie Cafritz - Vocals, Guitar
 Yoshimi P-We - Drums, Trumpet
 Mark Ibold - Bass
 Wharton Tiers - Drums on "Loose Lips"

External links
 band biography on Wiiija

1994 compilation albums
Free Kitten albums